David Elliott was the third president of Washington College from 1830 to 1831.

Following the resignation of Andrew Wylie, Washington College was temporarily suspended in 1829 due to the difficulty in finding a candidate willing to accept the presidency, and several Trustees resigned from the Board.  Elliot was appointed temporary president of Washington College on September 28, 1830.  He received a Doctor of Divinity degree from Jefferson College in 1835, and Doctor of Laws degree from Washington College in 1847.  From his resignation as president on November 7, 1831, until 1865, he was president of the Washington College Board of Trustees. 

Elliot died March 18, 1874, at the age of 88 years.

His grandson was academic John Livingston Lowes, a graduate of Washington & Jefferson College.

Writings

References

Further reading

Presidents of Washington & Jefferson College
1787 births
1874 deaths
Presbyterian Church in the United States of America ministers